Clipping Adam is a 2004 American drama film written and directed by Michael Picchiottino and starring Chris Eigeman, Louise Fletcher, Robert Pine, Bryan Burke, Ryan Willis, Kevin Sorbo and Evan Peters.

Cast
Evan Peters as Adam Sheppard
Chris Eigeman as Tom Sheppard
Louise Fletcher as Grammy
Robert Pine as Principal Biggs
Bryan Burke as Johnny Dominguez
Kevin Sorbo as Father Dan
Megan Strahm
Cassidy Burwell as Sara Shepard
Donato Mario Alleva
Ryan Willis

References

External links
 
 

American drama films
2000s English-language films
2000s American films